Ghayl Bin Yamin District is a district of the Hadhramaut Governorate, Yemen. As of 2003, the district had a population of 28,120 inhabitants.

References 

Districts of Hadhramaut Governorate